Saraswati Shishu Vidya Mandir, Bokaro is a co-educational school affiliated to the CBSE. This is one of the schools run by the Vidya Bharati Akhil Bharatiya Shiksha Sansthan, a non-governmental organisation. Within a short span of time the school has distinguished itself in the field of education because of the success of its students in board examinations, competitive examinations as well as in the various cultural and sports activities.

See also
Education in India
Literacy in India
List of schools in India

References

External links

Schools in Jharkhand
Education in Bokaro Steel City